Sac Community School District was a school district headquartered in Sac City, Iowa. It had  of area.

It operated Sac Elementary School and Sac Junior-Senior High School.

History

In 1876 the district was established.

In 2001 it had about 575 students.

In 2007 the Sac district and the Wall Lake View Auburn Community School District, prior to their legal merger, had established a grade-sharing program in which each district sent students to the other district for certain educational levels; it was under the name "East Sac Schools." Barb Kruthoff, the superintendent of the Walled Lake View district, became the shared superintendent of the two districts, and remained so up until 2010, just prior to the merger, so a new individual could become the superintendent of the legally combined school system. On July 1, 2011, the two districts legally merged into the East Sac County Community School District.

References

External links
 

Education in Sac County, Iowa
Defunct school districts in Iowa
School districts established in 1876
1876 establishments in Iowa
School districts disestablished in 2011
2011 disestablishments in Iowa